"Uhn Tiss Uhn Tiss Uhn Tiss" is the eleventh track and the second single from American rock band Bloodhound Gang's fourth studio album, Hefty Fine (2005). The title is an onomatopoeic representation of a typical four-on-the-floor dance beat. Released on November 25, 2005, the song became a top-20 hit in Austria, Flanders, and Germany.

Music video
Directed by Cousin Mike and Kevin Powers of Mucky Pup, the music video consists of a party in a club called the Wiper Room, a toilet-themed parody of the real-life LA Viper Room. Among the strange things going on in the various "stalls" are a Dutch girl using a butter-churn (a reference to the Kelly McGillis in the film Witness (1985 film)), a woman spinning around on roller skates, the Japanese band Electric Eel Shock playing their hearts out (but with no sound), a sullen-looking gangster that holds up a chain of hearts, Clark Kent entering a stall to change clothes to Superman, what seems to be either Jim Jones (complete with Kool-aid drinking cultists) or a contemporary Jesus Christ, played by Jemaine Clement, giving out wine, Telly "Leatherface" Blackwood and the Executioner "Maurico Broadway" Wrestlers from Viva La Bam were wrestling, a man in a leather jacket (mimicking George Michael from his 'Faith' video, with the word "regret" printed on the rear) dancing, a robot choking a scientist (played by David Lovering of The Pixies) who is frantically trying to control it, and a man made up as Tony Montana eating powdered sugar doughnuts (which previously make it appear that he is snorting cocaine). Youtuber "Mr. Safety" or "smpfilms" (Cory Williams) is seen dancing in many shots.

Singer Jimmy Pop is the main focus of the video, as he is singing in a bathroom stall. An attractive girl enters the stall next to him and begins to dance. Pop spies on her through a glory hole in the wall of the stall, but happens to stop paying attention as the girl leaves and a dog enters the bathroom. One thing leads to another and before long, Pop thinks he is making out with the girl, but instead it is the dog, a fact which he does not seem to realize. In the dirty version of the music video, Pop lines himself up with the hole to receive fellatio, with the dog still on the other end. He leaves the bathroom, and, at the end of the video, he leaves the club with the dog and a trail of toilet paper coming off his foot. The remainder of the band appear in a few shots.

Natasha Thorp provides the voice of the female singer, but Vera Kopp is the actress that appears in the video. Remixes are included by DJ Tomcraft and Scooter.

Charts

Weekly charts

Year-end charts

Release history

References

2005 singles
2005 songs
Bloodhound Gang songs
Geffen Records singles
Republic Records singles
Songs written by Jimmy Pop